35th/Archer is an 'L' station on the CTA's Orange Line, located in the McKinley Park neighborhood. The station has a Park 'n' Ride lot with 70 spaces.

Bus connections
CTA
35 31st/35th
39 Pershing
50 Damen
62 Archer (Owl Service)

Notes and references

Notes

References

External links
Chicago L.org: Stations - 35th/Archer
CTA - Train schedule
35th/Archer Station Page CTA official site
entrance from Google Maps Street View

CTA Orange Line stations
Railway stations in the United States opened in 1993
Railway stations in Chicago
McKinley Park, Chicago